Barkisland is a village in Calderdale, West Yorkshire, England.

The village falls within the Ryburn ward of Calderdale. Barkisland has one school, a church, a post office and a local cricket club which play in the Huddersfield Cricket League. There are two pubs in Barkisland, the Fleece and the Griffin.

History
A ten-thousand-year-old axe has been discovered near Ringstone Reservoir, providing evidence of human activity in the area now known as Barkisland dating back to the Stone Age. The origin of the name is in dispute. In a book of place names printed in 1944 it was stated that Barkisland derived from it being a settlement ('land') of a chieftain called 'Barkis'. While much earlier, in 1789, the Rev. John Watson, vicar of Ripponden church between 1754 and 1769, theorised that "Barsey or Barkesey are Anglo-Saxon words meaning low-lying enclosures where birches grow. It also is the Anglo-Saxon for a district where there are wolves."

The parish of Barkisland was recorded on 1 July 1837 as part of the Halifax Registration District. It was abolished as a distinct parish on 1 April 1937 and merged with the neighbouring parish of Ripponden.

Industry
Bowers Mill was built in the 18th century as a water-powered fulling mill. it has also been used as a corn mill, a worsted mill and a woolen mill. Textiles manufacturer J. & S. Taylor Ltd occupied the mill from 1882 to 1991 before moving production to Sowerby Bridge. The mill has now been converted for smaller businesses.

Barkisland Mill is a 6-storey building which was used for textile production in the 19th and 20th centuries. At the start of the 21st century it was converted into residential flats. There was also a Bottomley's Mill in Barkisland. Its presence as a cotton mill was recorded when a fire broke out there on 13 January 1871.

Governance
Barkisland is a village in the civil parish of Ripponden, which is part of the Ryburn ward of Calderdale, a metropolitan borough within the ceremonial county of West Yorkshire in England.

Geography
Barkisland is situated on a hilltop that gently rises from Greetland in the north-east and declines westwards to Ripponden and eastwards to Stainland. The hill continues to climb southwards towards Scammonden.

Landmarks

A surviving historic landmark of Barkisland are the original stocks. They are located on Stainland Road roughly 550 yards east of the post office and are a Grade II listed building.

Part of the Anglican Diocese of Wakefield, Christ Church is Barkisland's only church and is linked with the nearby school.

Barkisland Hall is a grade I listed country house built for John Gledhill in 1638, constructed in stone in three storeys to an F-shaped floor plan. It was bought in 1967 by Lord Kagan to provide accommodation for his textile company (makers of the Gannex raincoat).

Education
Barkisland's school is a high-performing junior and infant school many of its pupils progress to one of the two grammar schools, North Halifax Grammar School and Crossley Heath Grammar School.

Barkisland School Association (BSA) is a parent-teacher organisation supporting the school by organising events and fundraising.

See also
Listed buildings in Ripponden

References

Villages in West Yorkshire
Ripponden